NMKY may refer to:

NMKY is the Finnish abbreviation of YMCA
Lappeenrannan NMKY, a basketball club based in the city of Lappeenranta, Finland
NMKY Helsinki, a YMCA in Helsinki, Finland
"NMKY", a Finnish version of the song "Y.M.C.A."